Montero is a city and a municipality in Santa Cruz, Bolivia, about 50 km north of Santa Cruz de la Sierra. Montero had a population of 137,931 as of 2020 and has experienced growth in recent decades, becoming an important city in the region.

Montero has an elevation of about 300 meters above sea level and an average temperature of 23 °C (73.4 °F). The city is predominantly agricultural, producing soybeans, cotton, corn, and rice.

References

Populated places in Santa Cruz Department (Bolivia)